That Old Feeling is an album by saxophonist and arranger Al Cohn and His Orchestra featuring trumpeter Joe Newman recorded in 1955 for the RCA Victor label.

Reception

Allmusic awarded the album 3 stars.

Track listing
 "That Old Feeling" (Sammy Fain, Lew Brown) - 2:49
 "Gone With The Wind" (Allie Wrubel, Herb Magidson) - 3:05
 "Sweet and Lovely" (Gus Arnheim, Harry Tobias, Jules LeMare) – 2:12
 "Soft as Spring" (Alec Wilder) - 3:36
 "I'll Take Romance" (Ben Oakland, Oscar Hammerstein II) - 2:48
 "Azure-Té (Paris Blues)" (Don Wolf, Bill Davis) - 3:42
 "I'll Be Around" (Wilder) - 2:58
 "Swingin' the Blues" (Count Basie, Eddie Durham) - 3:16
 "Trouble Is a Man" (Wilder) - 2:49
 "Honey Blonde" (Jerry Leshay) - 3:07
 "Willow Weep for Me" (Ann Ronell) - 3:20
 "In a Mellow Tone" (Duke Ellington) - 2:49
Recorded at Webster Hall in New York City on May 6 (tracks 1, 2, 9 & 11), May 11 (tracks 3 & 5-7) and May 13 (tracks 4, 8, 10 & 12), 1955

Personnel 
Al Cohn - tenor saxophone
Joe Newman - trumpet
Hank Jones - piano
Freddie Green - guitar
Milt Hinton - bass
Osie Johnson - drums
Gene Orloff - concertmaster, violin
Fred Buldrini (tracks 4, 8, 10 & 12), Max Hollander, Harry Katzman (tracks 3-8, 10 & 12), Leo Kruczek, Milton Lomask, Harry Lookofsky (tracks 3, 5, 6 & 6), Harry Melnikoff (tracks 1-4 & 9-12), Seymour Miroff (tracks 1, 2, 9 & 11), Julius Schnachter (tracks 1, 2, 9 & 11), Paul Winter (tracks 1, 2, 9 & 11) - violin
Bernie Greenhouse (tracks 1-3, 5-7, 9 & 11), George Ricci (tracks 3 & 5-7), Lucien Schmidt (tracks 1-3, 5-7, 9 & 11), Morris Stonzek (tracks 1-3 & 11)  
Manny Albam (tracks 4, 7, 9 & 10), Ralph Burns (tracks 5, 6 & 11), Al Cohn (tracks 1, 3 & 12), Ernie Wilkins (tracks 2 & 8) - arranger

References 

1956 albums
RCA Records albums
Al Cohn albums
Albums arranged by Manny Albam
Albums arranged by Ralph Burns
Albums arranged by Ernie Wilkins